Gabrielle Stone is an American author, actress, dancer and director known for movies and television series such as Speak No Evil and Cut. Stone has worked with actors Billy Zane, Mischa Barton and her mother Dee Wallace in Zombie Killers: Elephant's Graveyard.

Biography
Stone was born in Los Angeles, the only child of actor Christopher Stone and actress Dee Wallace. While growing up in Los Angeles, California, Gabrielle Stone studied dance. Stone studied at the Ciara Dance studio in Woodland Hills, California where she is an alumna with more than 18 years of experience.

Filmography

Film

Television

References

External links

Official website

Living people
American film actresses
21st-century American actresses
American television actresses
Actresses from Los Angeles
American female dancers
Dancers from California
Year of birth missing (living people)